The 2012 NCAA Division I Men's Lacrosse Championship was the 42nd annual single-elimination tournament to determine the national championship for National Collegiate Athletic Association (NCAA) Division I men's college lacrosse. Sixteen teams were selected to compete in the tournament based upon their performance during the regular season, and for some, by means of a conference tournament automatic qualifier.

Tournament overview
The tournament started on May 12 and ended on May 28, with the Championship game being played at Gillette Stadium, home of the National Football League's New England Patriots. The United States Naval Academy hosted two quarterfinal matches on May 19 at Navy-Marine Corps Memorial Stadium in Annapolis, Maryland. Drexel University hosted the other two quarterfinal matches on May 20 at PPL Park in Chester, Pennsylvania.

Canisius (MAAC), Lehigh (Patriot League), Loyola (ECAC), Massachusetts (CAA), Stony Brook (America East), Syracuse (Big East), and Yale (Ivy League), earned an automatic bid into the tournament by winning their respective conference tournaments. During the tournament, the Colgate Raiders won their first ever NCAA Tournament game, defeating Massachusetts by a score of 13–11.

Eric Lusby for Loyola set a then tournament record for goals with 17, and the Loyola Greyhounds won their first ever NCAA lacrosse title in defeating unseeded Maryland, 9-3. Loyola began the season unranked. The Greyhounds were just the ninth school to win an NCAA Division I Men's Lacrosse championship, since tournament play began in 1971. Loyola won 12 straight games to start the season before losing their only game, an overtime loss to Johns Hopkins.

Tournament bracket

Tournament boxscores

Tournament Finals

Tournament Semi-Finals

Tournament Quarterfinals

Tournament First Round

All-Tournament
 Eric Lusby, A, Loyola (Most Outstanding Player)
 Josh Hawkins, M, Loyola
 Joe Fletcher, D, Loyola
 Scott Ratliff, LSM, Loyola
 Jack Runkel, G, Loyola
 Joe Cummings, A, Maryland
 Drew Snider, M, Maryland
 Jesse Bernhardt, D, Maryland
 Brendan J.R. Murphy, D, Canisius
 C.J. Costabile, LSM, Duke
 John Kemp, G, Notre Dame

Leading Scorers

References

External links
 Tournament statistics via NCAA

NCAA Division I Men's Lacrosse Championship
College sports in Massachusetts
Lacrosse in Massachusetts
Sports competitions in Foxborough, Massachusetts
NCAA Division I Men's Lacrosse Championship
NCAA Division I Men's Lacrosse Championship
NCAA Division I Men's Lacrosse Championship
NCAA Division I Men's Lacrosse Championship